Vasilis Konstantinou (born 19 November 1947) is a former Greek football goalkeeper whose career spanned three decades: the 1960s, 1970s and 1980s.

Club career
Born in Marousi, Konstantinou played football for Panathinaikos' youth team before becoming the back-up goalkeeper and under study of Takis Ikonomopoulos. He filled in successfully for his "mentor" when the situation called for it as was the case in the European Cup semi-finals against Red Star Belgrade (3-0) which sent PAO to the final. Eventually, Konstantinou became the first-team's keeper, a position he held until the 1983 season. He ended his career in 1984, playing for OFI. In the summer of 1973 he played abroad in the National Soccer League with Toronto Homer.

International career
Konstantinou was capped 28 times with Greece. He was the keeper for Greece for the UEFA Euro 1980 Final.

Honours

Panathinaikos
Alpha Ethniki: 1964–65, 1968–69, 1969–70, 1971–72, 1976–77
Greek Cup: 1966–67, 1968–69, 1976–77
Balkans Cup: 1977

References

External links

1947 births
Living people
Greek expatriate footballers
Greece international footballers
UEFA Euro 1980 players
Super League Greece players
Panathinaikos F.C. players
Panathinaikos F.C. presidents
OFI Crete F.C. players
Footballers from Athens
Greek footballers
Association football goalkeepers
PAS Giannina F.C. managers
Greek football managers
Canadian National Soccer League players
Greek expatriate sportspeople in Canada
Expatriate soccer players in Canada